Tapani Kaarlo Aarre Konstantin (Konsti) Järnefelt (16 June 1890, in Taipalsaari – 19 July 1959) was a Finnish politician. He was a Member of the Parliament of Finland from 1951 to 1954, representing the People's Party of Finland.

References

1890 births
1959 deaths
People from Taipalsaari
People from Viipuri Province (Grand Duchy of Finland)
People's Party of Finland (1951) politicians
Members of the Parliament of Finland (1951–54)